A working terrier is a small type of dog which pursues its quarry into the earth. According to the Oxford English Dictionary, the name dates back to at least 1440, derived from French chien terrier 'digging dog', which is from Medieval Latin terrarius, ultimately from Latin terra (earth).

With the growth of popularity of fox hunting in Britain in the 18th and 19th centuries, terriers were extensively bred to follow the red fox, as well as the Eurasian badger, into its burrow, referred to as "terrier work" and "going to ground". The purpose of the terrier is to locate the quarry, then either bark and bolt it free or to a net, or trap or hold it so that it can be dug down to and killed or captured.

Working terriers can be no wider than the animals they hunt (chest circumference or "span" less than 35 cm/14in), in order to fit into the burrows and still have room to manoeuver. As a result, the terriers often weigh considerably less than the fox (10 kg/22 lbs) and badger (12 kg/26 lbs), making these animals formidable quarry for the smaller dog.

Terrier work has been condemned by British animal welfare organizations such as the League Against Cruel Sports, the International Fund for Animal Welfare, and the Royal Society for the Prevention of Cruelty to Animals, because it can lead to underground fighting between the animals, causing serious injuries. The British National Working Terrier Federation denies that underground fighting is an issue, arguing that the terrier's role is to locate, bark, and flush out the hunted animals, not to attack them. Hunting below ground with terriers is largely illegal in Britain under the Hunting Act 2004, unless conducted in accordance with strict conditions intended to protect game birds.  Terrier work is legal in the US, Canada, Australia, South Africa, and much of continental Europe.

Requirements of a working terrier 
The primary criterion of a working terrier is that it has an owner or keeper who works it.  A terrier is not a working terrier by virtue of its breeding alone. The second most important quality of a working terrier is small chest size.  Though the chest size of the working terrier that can be used in any given situation may rise or fall depending on the size of the den pipe, smaller dogs generally do as well as or better than larger dogs.  The reason for this is rather simple:  a small dog can get to the quarry without having to dig, and arrives at the quarry without fatigue.

If a dog is too large, he will not be able to get past turns in the tunnel, and will have to be dug to every few feet.  If a dog has to dig to the quarry when the tunnel tightens down (as it invariably will), the dog will have to push dirt behind it to progress, which can result in the dog being “bottled” by dirt from behind.  In such a situation the dog will have a very difficult time getting out on its own if it cannot turn around.

With two animals underground (dog and quarry), it is essential that a flow of air be maintained to avoid asphyxiation.  The tighter a dog is in the pipe, the more the air flow will be constricted.  In addition, a small dog has better maneuverability and can more easily avoid being bitten.  Because of this, small dogs often receive less injury underground than larger dogs, which are more likely to find themselves jammed in a den pipe, face to face with the quarry, and unable to move forward or backward.

Other important requirements of a working terrier are an essential gameness, a good nose, and an ability to problem solve in order to avoid coming to harm underground.

Terrier work as vermin control 
A wide variety of game is worked below ground with terriers, including red foxes, groundhogs (also known as woodchucks), raccoons, opossums, nutria (also known as coypu), and European and American badgers.

According to a 1994 survey by the British Association for Shooting and Conservation, 9% of foxes killed by UK gamekeepers were killed following the use of terriers.

Terrier work is not a very efficient way of hunting vermin, though over 500 members of the Royal College of Veterinary Surgeons argue that it is a humane way to reduce fox numbers, and is quite selective. Because of these characteristics, terrier work is considered an ideal way to control certain nuisance wildlife in farm country.

The inefficiency of terrier work means that, unlike poisons and traps, there is no danger that a species can be wiped out over a large area, and little chance that an adult will be terminated with unseen young still in the den.

Though inefficient, a team of terriers, when coupled with an enthusiastic digger, can control red foxes, raccoons or groundhogs on small farms where their presence might be a problem for chickens, geese, wild bird populations, and crop production. Because terrier work is selective, animals can be dispatched, or else they can be moved and relocated to nearby farms, forests or waste areas where they will do no harm.

Early history 

Terrier work, as it is known today, began with the rise of the Enclosure Movement in the late 18th Century in England. With enclosure, people were moved off the land and into cities and towns, and sheep and other livestock were moved into newly walled, hedged and fenced fields. Vast expanses of enclosed open spaces proved perfect for mounted fox hunting – a sport that had arrived in the UK from France in the late 17th Century.

The first mounted fox hunts were described by Sir Walter Scott, who also described the first working terriers in the UK. The first true breed of working terrier that bears a resemblance to what we see in the field today is the Jack Russell Terrier. The Jack Russell Terrier is named after the Reverend John Russell, whose long life (1795–1883) encompasses the entire early history of mounted fox hunts in the UK and who is credited with breeding the first fox-working white-bodied terrier used in the field today.

With the rise of the Enclosure Movement in the late 18th Century and early 19th Century came the control of sires and the rapid improvement in livestock herds.  As breeds were improved, livestock shows were held to display these improvements. From these livestock shows grew the first dog shows.

The first dog show appeared in the UK in 1859, the same year that Charles Darwin’s the "Origin of Species" was first published. Both Darwin's book and the first dog shows drew much of their inspiration from the rapid "speciation" of new livestock breeds that had first begun with Robert Bakewell’s efforts to control sire selection. If livestock breeds could be rapidly “improved” through controlled breeding, clearly the same thing could be done with dogs.

Between 1800 and 1865, the number of dog breeds in the UK climbed from 15 to over 50, and it significantly increased further with the creation of the Kennel Club in 1873.

Rootstock 

In the world of working terriers, there are but two roots – colored dogs from the north (Scotland), and white dogs from the south (England and Wales). From these two roots spring a variety of Kennel Club dogs and every type of working terrier commonly found in the field today.

The "Fell Terrier" is the original non-pedigree colored working dog of the north. From this diverse gene pool has sprung the Kennel Club Welsh Terrier, the Lakeland Terrier and the Border Terrier. Today, only the Border Terrier is occasionally found in the field. This is not to say the working Fell Terrier has disappeared—it still exists by that name among working terrier enthusiasts.

Today's working Fell Terrier may be brown, black, red, or black-and-tan, and may be smooth, wire or broken coated.  The dog may be called a Fell terrier or a "working Lakeland" or a "Patterdale Terrier." A German variety of the Fell Terrier is called the "Jagdterrier," but the standard for this dog is on the large size, and as a consequence it is most useful in large pipes, artificial earths, or when it has been bred down to a 12–13 inch size.

From the southern part of England have come the white fox-working dogs whose origins are the same as those of the Jack Russell Terrier.  Kennel Club breeds derived from these mainly-white coated dogs include the Smooth Fox Terrier, the Wire Fox Terrier, the Sealyham Terrier and most recently, the Parson Russell Terrier and Russell Terrier. None of these Kennel Club breeds are commonly found working in the field today.

The absence of white-bodied working dogs in the Kennel Club does not mean that white fox-working dogs have disappeared. The working Jack Russell Terrier is still as common as ever, presenting itself in a variety of coats (smooth, broken and wire coated or rough), sizes (10 inches to 15 inches tall with most working dogs sized 10 to 13 inches tall), and coat colors (from pure white to 49 percent colored with tan and black markings). There is even a new type of working Jack Russell – the "Plummer Terrier" first created by Brian Plummer in the 1970s.

Tools and technique 
The tools used for terrier work have essentially remained unchanged for more than 400 years – a small-chested and very game working terrier, a good roundpoint shovel, a digging bar, a brushhook to clear away hedge and bramble, fox nets, water for the dog and digger, and a snare to remove the quarry or a gun or blunt instrument to dispatch it.

The only “modern” piece of equipment found in a terrierman’s kit that would look foreign to a terrierman from the late 18th Century is an electronic radio collar used to help locate the dog underground and speed the dig.   Locator collars have greatly increased the safety of dogs when underground, and no sensible digger will put a dog to ground without one today.

Controversy in the UK

Terrier work has come under criticism from animal welfare groups in the UK, particularly in connection with fox hunting, where terriers may be used to flush out a fox who has gone underground. This has led to the terriers attacking the foxes rather than flushing them out, causing a distressing and prolonged death of the fox. The Countryside Alliance have been challenged on their statements of claiming that no distressing and prolonged deaths occur during digging out or flushing out of foxes.

Organisations such as the League Against Cruel Sports have produced a range of reports on the working terrier. In 1994, Alan Williams, the Labour MP for Swansea West, proposed a private members bill, the Protection of Dogs Bill, seeking to ban the activity, but it was not banned in the UK until the passage of the Hunting Act 2004. The Act outlaws terrier work unless it complies with a number of strict conditions designed for gamekeepers.

See also
Baiting
Fox hunting legislation
Jack Russell Terrier
Patterdale Terrier
Sealyham Terrier

References

General references 
 Burns, Patrick. American Working Terriers, 2005.  
 Chapman, Eddie. "The Working Jack Russell Terrier," 1994. 
 Fischer, John. "Vulpicide in South Nottinghamshire in 1865"
 MacDonald, David. "Running With the Fox." 1987.  
 League Against Cruel Sports campaign against terrier work
 "Badger baiter banned after terriers hurt", Sheffield Today, 8 August 2005

External links

 Hunting with Terriers:  The Basics
 Jack Russell Terrier Club of America
 Jack Russell Terrier Club Great Britain
 Teckel Club of North America
 Patterdale Terrier Club of America
 German hunting terrier
 Tips for Tunnel Training Terriers
 American Working Terrier Association
 A Pictorial History of Terriers and Terrier Work
 Border Terrier Show Results in the U.K.

Dog types
Terriers
Hunting dogs